Carlos Soler may refer to:

 Carlos Soler (footballer) (born 1997), Spanish footballer
 Carlos Soler Márquez (born 1972), Spanish wheelchair fencer